Halldór Halldórsson (13 April 1931 – 14 November 2003) was an Icelandic footballer. He played in eleven matches for the Iceland national football team from 1949 to 1957.

References

External links
 

1931 births
2003 deaths
Halldor Halldorsson
Halldor Halldorsson
Place of birth missing
Association footballers not categorized by position